Australian Software Innovation Forum, is an industry group that encourages collaboration and co-operation and is committed to assisting companies understand and develop skills in Java EE and associated technologies.

The Australian Software Innovation Forum was formerly known as Enterprise Java Victoria and Enterprise Java Australia.

History
The not-for-profit organisation was originally co-founded by Peter Campbell (ANZ) and Rob Janson (Hubbub) with guidance and assistance from Ian Goddard (Hubbub).  The organisation's purpose was local experience sharing and networking.

The Victorian Government supported the formation of Australian Software Innovation Forum in 2002. Since then Australian Software Innovation Forum has actively encouraged learning and collaboration in the Java EE space between enterprises, architects, developers, vendors, universities, and government.

Australian Software Innovation Forum runs regular seminars and industry forums to share industry experiences in applying Java technologies in the enterprise.

In 2010 Enterprise Java changed its name to the Australian Software Innovation Forum.

External links
 Australian Software Innovation Forum

Internet in Australia